At , Morgans Pond Hole in Manchester Parish, Jamaica is the second deepest known cave in the island.

See also
 List of caves in Jamaica
Jamaican Caves Organisation
Manchester Parish, Jamaica

References

External links
Map.
Aerial view.
Photos:
Caving in Jamaica.
Morgans Pond Hole Field Notes.

Caves of Jamaica
Geography of Manchester Parish
Caves of the Caribbean